Babylon the Bandit is an album by the reggae band Steel Pulse, released in 1986. It won the Grammy Award for Best Reggae Album, the only time the award has been won by a non-Jamaican artist.

Production
The album was produced by Jimmy "Senyan" Haynes.

Critical reception

Trouser Press wrote that "it was clear that the band’s professed ideals were no longer jibing with their attempts to crack the (American) market ... Protest lyrics swathed in slick, upwardly mobile production were pretty hard to take seriously." The Providence Journal thought that "while exploring weighty themes, Steel Pulse never becomes shrill or ponderous and the album is smartly leavened with catchy, fun songs about school boy crushes, gold-digging women, and the ups and downs of love." The Omaha World-Herald opined that "the songs, overall, have a very calm, almost benign feel, with very simple love songs seeming to dominate over songs about saving culture in history and music."

Track listing
"Save Black Music" – 4:17
"Not King James Version" – 4:13
"School Boy's Crush (Jail Bait)" – 4:18
"Sugar Daddy" – 4:35
"Kick That Habit" – 3:42
"Blessed Is the Man" – 4:25
"Love Walks Out" – 4:26
"Don't Be Afraid" – 4:56
"Babylon the Bandit" – 5:08

References

Steel Pulse albums
1985 albums
Mango Records albums
Grammy Award for Best Reggae Album